On the Beat is a 1962 British comedy film directed by Robert Asher and starring Norman Wisdom, Jennifer Jayne and Raymond Huntley.

Plot
Norman Pitkin (Norman Wisdom) works at Scotland Yard as a car cleaner, but dreams of becoming a policeman as his late father was. The police reject his request to join the force, but later recruit him to work undercover in disguise. He has turned out to be the double twin of a suspected jewel thief, an Italian crime boss in London. In addition to his criminal activities, this man is a ladies' hairdresser.

Norman disguises himself as the suspect and gains entry to his salon. Once inside, after some inevitable mishaps, he manages to find the stolen goods, knock out the suspect, wrap him up in a curtain/wall rug, and bring him to justice.

As a reward, he is offered a permanent position in the police and marries his love, the ex-girlfriend of the man he brought to justice (whom he had rescued earlier in the film when she was attempting to commit suicide by jumping in the river).

Cast

Production
On the Beat was shot at Pinewood Studios and on location around Windsor. The film's sets were designed by the art director Bert Davey. It marked a return to Rank for Wisdom following two films for United Artists, although the latter handled the film for distribution in North America.

Reception
The film was one of the 12 most popular movies at the British box office in 1963. According to Kine Weekly the four most popular films at the British box office in 1963 were From Russia With Love, Summer Holiday, Tom Jones and The Great Escape, followed by, in alphabetical order, Doctor in Distress, The Fast Lady, Girls! Girls! Girls!, Heaven's Above, Jason and the Argonauts, In Search of the Castaways, It Happened at the World's Fair, The Longest Day, On the Beat, Sodom and Gomorrah, The V. I. Ps, and The Wrong Arm of the Law.

Music
A slightly different arrangement of the film's title theme, by composer Philip Green, was recorded for a production music library, and may be heard in many American animated cartoons of the early 1960s, particularly those from Hanna-Barbera Productions.

References

Bibliography
 Hunter, I.Q. & Porter, Laraine. British Comedy Cinema. Routledge, 2012.

External links

On the Beat Trailer

1962 films
1962 comedy films
British comedy films
British black-and-white films
Films set in London
Films shot at Pinewood Studios
Films directed by Robert Asher
1960s English-language films
1960s British films